Krajná Porúbka is a village and municipality in Svidník District in the Prešov Region of north-eastern Slovakia.

History
In historical records the village was first mentioned in 1582.

Geography
It has a population of about 56 people.

Genealogical resources
The records for genealogical research are available at the state archive "Statny Archiv in Presov, Slovakia"
 Greek Catholic church records (births/marriages/deaths): 1787-1950 (parish B)

See also
 List of municipalities and towns in Slovakia

References

External links
 
Surnames of living people in Krajná Porúbka

Villages and municipalities in Svidník District
Populated places established in 1582
Šariš